The Uniform Machine Gun Act was drafted and published by the National Conference of Commissioners on Uniform State Laws.  Maryland (1939), South Dakota (1939), Arkansas (1947), Montana (1947), Wisconsin (1947), Connecticut (1947), and Virginia (1950) adopted the act as law.

References

External links 
 National Conference of Commissioners on Uniform State Laws

Uniform Acts
United States firearms law